Dilated fundus examination or dilated-pupil fundus examination (DFE) is a diagnostic procedure that employs the use of mydriatic eye drops (such as tropicamide) to dilate or enlarge the pupil in order to obtain a better view of the fundus of the eye. Once the pupil is dilated, examiners use ophthalmoscopy (funduscopy) to view the eye's interior, allowing assessment of the retina, optic nerve head, blood vessels, and other features. They also often use specialized equipment such as a fundus camera. DFE has been found to be a more effective method for evaluation of internal ocular health than non-dilated examination. It is frequently performed by ophthalmologists and optometrists as part of an eye examination.

References

Diagnostic ophthalmology
Human pupil